Rathnure is a small village on the R731 regional road about  from the town of Enniscorthy, County Wexford, Ireland.  The village is located at the foot of the Blackstairs Mountain, which borders County Carlow on the opposite side.

Places of interest
Local points of interest include the John Kelly Memorial and grave in Kilanne, and Monksgrange House. Monksgrange House, which is owned by the Hill family and was built in 1769, contains an art gallery, which exhibits works by contemporary Irish artists such as William Scott, Harry Kernoff and Hilda Roberts.  Monksgrange has also played host to the performances of the Blackstairs Opera.

Sport
Rathnure St. Annes GAA Club is the local Gaelic Athletic Association team. Principally involved in hurling, club members have included Nicky Rackard (who represented Wexford in both hurling and Gaelic football). Rathnure hold 20 county senior hurling titles and 6 Leinster titles - a record in the county.

See also
 List of towns and villages in Ireland

References 

Towns and villages in County Wexford